This is a list of museums in Lazio, Italy.

References

Lazio
Museums in Lazio